Bi Skaarup (September 9, 1952, in Copenhagen – March 15, 2014, in Copenhagen) was a Danish archeologist, author, food historian and lecturer. She was employed at Museum of Copenhagen from 1985 to 2006 as curator, and was responsible for parts of the excavations during the construction of Copenhagen Metro and wrote several articles about the subjects.

In 1995–96 she helped to develop the medieval restaurant The Golden Swan at the Danish open-air museum Middelaldercentret at Nykøbing Falster. She worked as a consultant until her death.

In 2006 she moved to Falster with her husband to do courses and lectures in historical cookery.

She wrote multiple cookbooks about historical food, and was appointed president of the Danish Gastronomic Academy, which she became a member of in 1991. She participated in numerous television programs about historical cooking, especially on the Danish television channel dk4 together with the journalist Frantz Howitz. She died in the spring of 2014 after long illness. She was mentioned as a pioneer in her work with the history of food.

Bibliography

Books 
1997 Mad og spisevaner fra middelalderen, Middelaldercentret 
1999 Middelaldermad. Kulturhistorie, kilder og 99 opskrifter. With Henrik Jacobsen. 
2006 Renæssancemad. Opskrifter og køkkenhistorie fra Christian 4.'s tid 
2011 Bag brødet: dansk brød og bagning gennem 6000 år 
2014 Kongelige Tafler

Articles 
1988 "Arkæologiske undersøgelser i København", Københavns Kronik nr. 42, s. 5–8
1991 "Gammeltorv – Nytorv", Københavns Kronik nr. 53, s. 3–7
1992 "Nyt om Københavns arkæologi", Københavns Kronik nr. 58, s. 8
1993 "Nyt om Københavns arkæologi", Københavns Kronik nr. 61, s. 3–4
1994 "Soffye", Skalk nr. 5; s. 26–29
1995 "Nyt om Københavns arkæologi", Københavns Kronik nr. 67, s. 2–3
1997 "1000-års historie under Kongens Nytorv", Københavns Kronik nr. 77, s. 5–9

Contributions 
Dahl, Bjørn Westerbeek; Skaarup, Bi og Christensen, Peter Thorning; Guide til Københavns Befæstning. 900 års befæstningshistorie, København: Environment- and Ministry of Energy, Danish Nature Agency 1996.  Online

Roesdahl, Else (red.) Dagligliv i Danmarks Middelalder. Chapter: "Samfærdsel, handel og penge", 1999 .

References 

Danish archaeologists
People from Copenhagen
Women cookbook writers
1952 births
2014 deaths
20th-century Danish women writers
21st-century Danish women writers
Danish women archaeologists